Wust may refer to:

Wust, Saxony-Anhalt, a village in the district of Stendal, Saxony-Anhalt, Germany
Wust-Fischbeck, a municipality in the district of Stendal, Saxony-Anhalt, Germany
WUST, a radio station broadcasting in Washington, DC
Wüst or Wuest, a surname